Bottle Beach may refer to:

 Bottle Beach, Washington, U.S., see Bottle Beach State Park
 Hat Khuat, Thailand, translates as "Bottle Beach"
 Bottle Beach, New York on the shore of Dead Horse Bay